{{DISPLAYTITLE:C65H82N2O18S2}}
The molecular formula C65H82N2O18S2 (molar mass: 1243.49 g/mol) may refer to:

 Atracurium besilate
 Cisatracurium besilate

Molecular formulas